A Sage Brush Hamlet is a 1919 American silent Western film directed by Joseph J. Franz and written by Rex Taylor and Irma Whipley Taylor. It stars William Desmond, Florence Gibson, and Edward Piel.

Cast list

References

1919 films
1919 Western (genre) films
American black-and-white films
Films directed by Joseph Franz
Silent American Western (genre) films
1910s English-language films
1910s American films